Kaveh the Blacksmith, is a 5000-year-old figure in Iranian mythology who leads a popular uprising against a ruthless foreign ruler, Zahāk. His story is narrated in the Shahnameh, the national epic of Iran (Persia), by the 10th-century Persian poet Ferdowsi.

Kāveh was, according to ancient legends, a blacksmith who launched a national uprising against the evil foreign tyrant Zahāk, after losing two of his children to serpents of Zahāk. Kāveh expelled the foreigners and re-established the rule of Iranians. Many followed Kāveh to the Alborz Mountains in Damāvand, where Fereydun, son of Ābtin and Faranak was living. Then a young man, Fereydun agreed to lead the people against Zahāk. Zahāk had already left his capital, which fell to Fereydun's troops with little resistance. Fereydun released all of Zahāk's prisoners.

Kāveh is the most famous of Persian mythological characters in resistance against despotic foreign rule in Iran. As a symbol of resistance and unity, he raised his leather apron on a spear. This flag, known as Derafsh Kaviani, was later decorated with precious jewels and became the symbol of Persian sovereignty for hundreds of years, until captured and destroyed by the Arabs, following the defeat of the Sassanids at the 636 Battle of al-Qadisiyyah. Ya'qub ibn al-Layth al-Saffar, who rebelled against the Abbasid Caliphate, claimed the inheritance of the kings of Persia and sought "to revive their glory," in 867 he sent a poem written by himself to the Abbasid caliph Al-Mu'tazz, stating: "With me is the Derafsh Kaviani, through which I hope to rule the nations." In later times, Kaveh the Blacksmith was invoked by Iranian nationalists starting from the generation of Mirza Fatali Akhundov. His name was used as the title of a nationalist newspaper in 1916, and in 1920, adorned the canton of the flag of the Persian Socialist Soviet Republic (widely known as the Soviet Republic of Gilan).

Mehregan is the celebration for Fereydun's victory over Zahāk.

The dynasty of Karen Pahlav (also known as the House of Karen) claimed to be Kāveh's descendants.

Kaveh is the head figure in the culture book of Irane Mardom, published in 2020 by the Iranian Danish teacher, Seyed Deydad Amoozegar, in Persian, Danish and English.

Mashhad-e Kaveh 
Kaveh is believed to originate from Mashhad-e Kaveh in Isfahan. It is believed he was born on January 12 some 5000 years ago. 
His birth certificate at his grave in Mashhad e Kaveh, is a poem from the Safavid dynasty era, indicating Kaveh’s birthday is two months and a week before the Nowruz night, 
thus it must be January 12. His birthday is a celebration day for friendship and justice.

Kaveh as celebrated by Kurds 

Called Kawe-y asinger in Kurdish mythology, some Kurds believe that the ancestors of the Kurds fled to the mountains to escape the oppression of an Assyrian king named Zahhak, who is later killed and overthrown at the hands of Kaveh. It is also believed that these people, like Kaveh the Blacksmith who took refuge in the mountains over the course of history created a Kurdish ethnicity. Kaveh is still an important geographical and symbolic figure in Kurdish nationalism. In common with other mythologies, Kurdish mythology sometimes is also used for political aims.

See also
Derafsh Kaviani
Kurdalægon
Tlepsh
Vulcan (mythology)

References

External links

First Iranian Legendary Heroes and Heroines: A Research Note by Manouchehr Saadat Noury
A king's book of kings: the Shah-nameh of Shah Tahmasp, an exhibition catalog from The Metropolitan Museum of Art (fully available online as PDF), which contains material on Kāveh

Persian mythology
Shahnameh characters
Blacksmiths
Kurdish mythology